KVVV-LD (channel 15) is a low-powered television station licensed to Houston, Texas, United States. The station is owned by Sovryn Holdings, and maintains multiple affiliations with several digital networks. KVVV-LD's transmitter is located near Missouri City, in unincorporated northeastern Fort Bend County.

History 
Originally owned by VVI LPTV Inc. (a subsidiary of the ValueVision home shopping network), the station began broadcasting under the call sign K53FV at the end of 1991.
xccv  m,./riginal transmitter site was at the top of the Texas Commerce Tower in downtown Houston.

The station was sold to Pappas Telecasting in July 1999. The new owners changed the call sign to KVVV-LP on February 21, 2000. During its brief time on the air under Pappas ownership, the station served as a repeater of Pappas' full-power station on channel 57 with KUGB. Pappas took the station off the air March 1, 2001, and the station remained off the air through November 2004.

In June 2004, the station was granted permission to move to a new tower site near Moses Lake north of Texas City. During construction, the tower at the Texas City site was found to be unsafe, and Pappas requested permission to broadcast temporarily from Missouri City beginning in September 2006.

On September 11, 2007, KVVV-LP was granted a permit to build a digital station on channel 15. The change in channel assignment was due to the Federal Communications Commission (FCC)'s auction of block B of the lower 700 MHz frequency band, which is now used by cellular telephones.

Pappas Telecasting's financial difficulties forced KVVV-LP to go off the air November 3, 2007. KVVV-LP's channel 53 analog transmitter was returned to the air briefly on October 30, 2009, to avoid cancellation of its license. (Federal law mandates that a station that is silent for more than a year must surrender its license.) A short time after transmissions resumed, a line carrying coolant to the transmitter burst, spraying coolant over the engineer and the transmitter. The channel 53 transmitter shut down immediately and never returned to the air.

The station's call sign was changed to KVVV-LD on January 28, 2011, and the station returned to the air on channel 15 on January 17, 2012. In January 2013, KVVV-LD (by now held by a liquidating trustee) was sold to Abraham Telecasting Company, which took over the station's operations on February 1 while the acquisition awaits FCC approval. The new owner quickly moved to add multicast channels to the station; The Word Network and Christian Television Network were the first two added.

Digital channels
The station's digital signal is multiplexed:

References

External links

Low-power television stations in the United States